Spach is a surname. Notable people with the surname include:

 Édouard Spach (1801–1879), French botanist
 Stephen Spach (born 1982), American football player

See also
 Spack